Enclave is a 2015 internationally co-produced drama film directed by Goran Radovanović. It was one of six films shortlisted by Serbia to be their submission for the Academy Award for Best Foreign Language Film at the 88th Academy Awards but it was not nominated. On 3 September 2015 it was selected to represent Serbia for the Foreign Language Oscar.

The main theme of the film is life of Kosovo Serbs in small isolated ethnic enclaves.

Plot
The film follows a young Serbian boy named Nenad, who was living in a ghetto that was the product of a previous war. Rather than having a linear plot line, the film focuses on the different unfortunate events in Nenad's life, sometimes revisiting past events. Specifically, the events are:
 Nenad is driven to school each day in an armoured car. This is due to the discrimination against him by everyone not living in his enclave. There is only one teacher at his school and he is also the only student. However, his teacher later leaves the war-torn place, and his school trips end.
 Nenad witnesses his grandfather die.
 Nenad gets mixed up with some bad friends. After swimming with them, his clothes fall into the river and are lost. As a result he is whipped by his father.
 A man attempts to steal Nenad's father's cattle and Nenad's father attempts to shoot him. The police arrive and arrest Nenad's father and confiscate all of his illegally owned weapons, which were kept in a box under his bed. The police offer Nenad's father a chance at employment at the police station, but he turns it down.
 Nenad's hostile friends trap him under a giant bell for refusing to play a game, and the leading boy (Baskim) pulls out a pistol and shoots the bell. This causes the bullet to ricochet and hit Baskim.
 Baskim's family questions him about who shot him. Baskim responds, "A Serb." Baskim's family and their gang set the Serbian enclave on fire, trapping Nenad under the bell tower. The heat and smoke nearly suffocates Nenad. Baskim feels guilt for trapping Nenad and revisits the bell where Nenad is trapped.
 Nenad's family decides they want a new life and end up moving to Belgrade after they free Nenad from under the bell. Nenad is not used to a school with many people and as a result he does not perform well socially.

Cast
 Filip Subarić as Nenad
 Denis Murić as Baskim
 Nebojša Glogovac as Vojislav Arsic
 Anica Dobra as Milica Arsic
 Miodrag Krivokapić as Otac Draža
 Goran Radaković as Cekic
 Meto Jovanovski as Milutin Arsic
 Qun Lajçi as Baskim's grandfather
 Nenad Jezdić as bus driver

See also
 List of submissions to the 88th Academy Awards for Best Foreign Language Film
 List of Serbian submissions for the Academy Award for Best Foreign Language Film

References

External links
 

2015 films
2015 drama films
Serbian drama films
2010s Serbian-language films
Serbian enclaves in Kosovo
Films about children
Films about harassment
Films about race and ethnicity
Films set in Serbia
Films shot in Serbia
Films shot in Belgrade